Johann Schwarz was an Austrian footballer who played as a defender. He played for DFC Prag in the inaugural German football championship in 1903, and also represented the Austria national football team in a friendly against England in 1908.

References

External links
 
 

Year of birth missing
Year of death missing
Austrian footballers
Austria international footballers
Association football defenders
DFC Prag players